Mumbo Island is an island within Lake Malawi National Park, located in the Salima District of the Central Region, some  east of the capital Lilongwe. It has no permanent settlement but is home to Mumbo Camp, an ecoboutique camp (i.e. an ecotourism boutique hotel).

Wildlife
The island is home to African fish eagles, monitor lizards, African clawless otters and a number of species of cichlid.

References

Lake Malawi
Lake islands of Malawi